Felix Fuld (19 July 1868 – 20 January 1929) built one of America's well-known department stores – L. Bamberger & Company with his partner, Louis Bamberger.  He was an early 20th century philanthropist contributing to many local, regional, and international organizations.  He arrived in Newark, New Jersey in 1892 and soon thereafter established the department store with Louis Bamberger and Louis Frank.  Felix Fuld married his business partner's sister, Caroline Bamberger Fuld who carried on his charitable work after his death at age 60, including the establishment of the Institute for Advanced Study.

Early life
Felix Fuld was born to a Jewish family in Frankfurt am Main, Germany, the son of Ludwig and Theresa Fuld who came to New York when Felix was 12.  Fuld's father was a partner in the New York City banking house of Sternberger, Sinn & Fuld. Sternberger, Sinn & Fuld later became Gruntal & Co. Through his father, Fuld found a job at the Chesapeake Rubber Company in Baltimore where he met Louis Bamberger.

L. Bamberger & Company
Felix Fuld joined Louis Bamberger and Bamberger's brother in-law, Louis M. Frank, to launch L. Bamberger & Company in 1893, a store with the tag line: One of America's Great Stores. A number of the store's policies were new to retailing such as merchandise labeled with prices, money back guarantees, and charge accounts. The store was very successful, achieving sales of $1,331,000 in 1898, $2,000,000 in 1908, $6,300,000 in 1913 and to a peak of $38,000,000 in 1928, the fourth highest in national department store total sales and the country's highest in per capita sales. Radio station WOR was launched in the store with Fuld's approval in 1922. Many of Bamberger's employees went on to successful careers in other notable stores: Harry Hatry became president of Jay Thorpe, Inc. in New York; James Schoff became president of Bloomingdale's; Max Robb became president of Lit Brothers, Philadelphia; Hector Suyker became president of The Fair Store, Chicago; and Pasqualo Gueriere became president of Kresge-Newark. When Bamberger's was sold to Macy's in 1929 for an estimated $25,000,000, the partners, Fuld and Bamberger, set aside $1,000,000 to be divided among their ″co-workers″ (how they insisted employees be referred to).

Philanthropic work
With his business partner and brother-in-law, Louis Bamberger, Felix Fuld contributed to numerous Newark and New Jersey institutions. Their generosity helped launch a building drive for the Newark YM-YWHA in 1922 that led to the construction of the impressive 654 High Street building in 1924, with an auditorium named 'Fuld Hall.'  They were also major donors to the first hospital in Newark that freely offered a place for Jewish doctors to practice, Beth Israel Hospital.  Fuld providing one third of Beth's original funding.

Personal life
The three initial Bamberger's partners (Frank, Bamberger, and Fuld) lived together with Bamberger's sister Caroline (Carrie) Bamberger who was Frank's wife in a rented house in South Orange, New Jersey. They later bought a large home on Centre Street in South Orange. Louis Frank died suddenly in 1910. Carrie Bamberger Frank remained a widow for eight years until 1918 when she married Felix Fuld.  The Fulds continued to live with Louis Bamberger, a bachelor, until the last survivor died in 1943. Felix Fuld succumbed to influenza and pneumonia and died on January 20, 1929, at his home in South Orange. A memorial service was held in the Old First Presbyterian Church in Newark attended by many of the City's notables. He was buried at the B'nai Jeshurun Cemetery, Elizabeth, New Jersey.

References

1868 births
1929 deaths
American businesspeople
American Jews
People from South Orange, New Jersey
Hutzler family